Casimir Lombardi (9 January 1901 – 18 June 1974) was a French racing cyclist. He rode in the 1928 Tour de France.

References

1901 births
1974 deaths
French male cyclists
Place of birth missing